Anthony Ryan is a Scottish writer of fantasy and science fiction, best known for his books about Vaelin Al Sorna, which started in 2013 with Blood Song. He worked as a full-time researcher before switching to full-time writing. He currently lives in London, England. He has a degree in Medieval History.

Biography
Anthony Ryan was born in Scotland in 1970 but has spent much of his adult life in London.
Anthony Ryan initially self-published Blood Song, however, he switched to major publication when Penguin books offered him a three-book deal in May 2012. He started writing full-time after the success of the publication. He continues to self-publish a series of SF Noir novellas.

Bibliography

Raven's Shadow Trilogy
 Blood Song (2013)
 Tower Lord (2014)
 Queen of Fire (2015)

Raven’s Blade Duology
Sequel Series to Raven’s Shadow Trilogy
 The Wolf’s Call (July 2019)
 The Black Song (August 2020)

Slab City Blues
 Slab City Blues (2011)
 A Song for Madame Choi (2011)
 A Hymn to Gods Long Dead (2012)
 The Ballad of Bad Jack (2013)
 An Aria for Ragnarok (2015)
 Slab City Blues: The Collected Stories (2015)

The Draconis Memoria Trilogy
 The Waking Fire (2016)
 The Legion of Flame (2017)
 The Empire of Ashes (2018)

Seven Swords Series
 A Pilgrimage of Swords (2019)
 The Kraken’s Tooth (2020)
 City of Songs (2021)

The Covenant of Steel
 The Pariah (August 2021)
 The Martyr (June 2022)

Short Stories
Raven's Shadow
 The Lord Collector. Available in Blackguards Anthology.
 A Duel of Evils. Available in Unfettered II Anthology.
 The Lady of Crows
 Many Are the Dead
The Draconis Memoria
 Sandrunners. Available in Legends II Anthology - Stories in Honour of David Gemmell.

References

External links
"Hi, I'm Anthony Ryan and I write fantasy and science fiction - AMA"
"Interview with Anthony Ryan, author of Blood Song (Raven's Shadow 1) - July 2, 2013"
"Blood Song"

1970 births
Living people
English fantasy writers
Scottish fantasy writers
Scottish male novelists